Skeels may refer to:
 Dave Skeels (1891–1926), an American baseball player
 Eric Skeels (born 1939), an English former football player
 Homer Collar Skeels (1873–1934, Skeels), an American agriculturist and botanist
 Luke Skeels (living), a guitarist, music teacher, music producer, session player and recording artist
 Talan Skeels-Piggins (born 1970), a British alpine skier

See also 
 Skeel (disambiguation)
 Skeels, Michigan, a community in the United States